The Sixth Alaska State Legislature served from January 1969 to January 1971.

Senate

House

See also
 List of Alaska State Legislatures
 5th Alaska State Legislature, the legislature preceding this one
 7th Alaska State Legislature, the legislature following this one
 List of governors of Alaska
 List of speakers of the Alaska House of Representatives
 Alaska Legislature
 Alaska Senate
 {AKLeg.gov}

References
General

Specific and Notes

1969 establishments in Alaska
Alaska
1970 in Alaska
Alaska
1971 disestablishments in Alaska
06